Abhyudaya Nagar is a colony located in Kalachowki  Near cotton green railway station . Kalachowki is to east of the parel.

Neighbourhoods in Hyderabad, India